Pyar Ki Jeet is a 1987 Indian Bollywood film directed by Sawan Kumar Tak. The film stars Ashok Kumar, Shashi Kapoor, Vinod Mehra, Rekha in lead roles. Moon Moon Sen has a special appearance here. The music was composed by Usha Khanna.

Plot
Soni (Rekha) is a young, beautiful, smart, bubbly and charming girl. She returns to her hometown village from the big city where she works as a garment merchant. The obsolete village residents regard her as a cheap woman, thinking the worst things about her frequent visits to the big city.

Soni does not find it important to justify herself. Only Dr. Rehman (Shashi Kapoor), a major doctor in the village, educated and clever, understands her circumstances. He takes care of everyone, everything, without charging money. He is the father of the village and everyone respects him. On the other side, Dr. Kumar (Ashok Kumar) is a rich and successful doctor in a city, formerly being good friends with Rehman. He has educated his son Dr. Anand (Vinod Mehra) at the best medicine academies. Once, he sends Anand to Rehman's village where all the hometown residents wrongly consider him as the new doctor who came to work as an assistant to Dr. Rehman. At first, he wants to explain himself and leave the village, but later, when he finds out that Rehman is ill and cannot manage to work alone, he decides to stay temporarily. When Soni returns again to the village and encounters him, she immediately falls in love with him. Anand also falls in love with Soni, but he denies his feelings, because of her reputation. Soni persecutes him everywhere and tries to conquer him in every possible way. Anand keeps on rejecting her. Will the two realize their love in spite of society's values?

Cast
Ashok Kumar as Dr. Kumar
Shashi Kapoor as Dr. Rehman
Vinod Mehra as Dr. Anand
Rekha as Soni
Moon Moon Sen as Rani Padmini Devi
Jagdeep as Nathulal
Pinchoo Kapoor as Village Sarpanch
Puneet Issar as Darshan Patel
Bharat Kapoor as Jagirdar

Music
Lyrics: Sawan Kumar Tak

External links

1987 films
1980s Hindi-language films
Films scored by Usha Khanna
Films directed by Saawan Kumar Tak